Nicholas Conaty  (1820–1886) was an Irish Roman Catholic bishop.  
 
He was born in Kilsallagh to John Conaty and his wife Honora Brady and educated at Kilmore Academy before completing his clerical studies in Maynooth College. Conaty was ordained a priest on 17 June 1848. He was on the staff of Cavan Diocesan Seminary from then until 1854. He was parish priest of Castlerahan from 1854 to 1863. Conaty was appointed co-adjutor Bishop of Kilmore in 1863, and Bishop of Kilmore in 1865 succeeding Dr James Browne. Before becoming a bishop he was a professor in Kilmore Diocesan Seminary, he also taught at All Hallows College Dublin, and served as parish priest in Knocktemple, Co. Cavan.

He established the new diocesan seminary and school St. Patrick's College, Cavan and employed the renowned church architect William Hague on its building and other church buildings in the diocese. 
He brought the Poor Clares (enclosed order of nuns) to Cavan in the 1860s.

He died on 17 January 1886 and was succeeded by Bishop Bernard Finegan, who had been the parish priest of Drumlane, Cavan.

Published works
The Catholic Church - proved to be the Church of Christ by Rev. N. Conaty, Published by James Duffy, 1852.

References

1865 deaths
Alumni of St Patrick's College, Maynooth
19th-century Roman Catholic bishops in Ireland
Roman Catholic bishops of Kilmore
1820 births
People from County Cavan